CN Lester (born 1984) is a British classical and alternative singer-songwriter, as well as an LGBT and transgender rights activist. They were rated 41st on The Independent on Sunday's 2013 Pink List, which acknowledged their co-founding of the Queer Youth Network and their founding the UK's first gay–straight alliance, as well as their fundraising for queer causes and writing for publications such as New Statesman and So So Gay.

Career 

Lester is a mezzo-soprano who specializes in castrati and travesti opera, as well as early and classical music and works by female composers. Classic FM has showcased their work and research on travesti roles, while BBC Radio 4's Front Row has included their work with Silent Opera. They've cited Lou Reed and Tchaikovsky as amongst their earliest influences, aged 3–4.

As a child, Lester began learning to play the piano at age 6, and received vocal coaching from age 13. They went on to obtain a BMus degree from King's College London and an MMus from Goldsmiths, University of London. In 2019, Lester received a PhD degree in music from the University of Huddersfield.

For they two most recent albums, Dark Angels and Aether, Lester paid for the recording and production using crowdfunding platform Indiegogo. The albums raised US$3414 and £4575 respectively.

In addition to performing live and recording music, Lester works as a teacher and an author. Their debut opera, The Lion-Faced Man, appeared at Tête à Tête: The Opera Festival in August 2015, including a libretto by Hel Gurney and sung by Alison Wells. Their first book, Trans Like Me: A Journey For All Of Us was published by Virago Press in May 2017.

Discography

Awards 

Lester was ranked 41st on The Independent on Sunday's 2013 Pink List of the most influential LGBT people, and 92nd in the renamed 2014 Rainbow List.

Identity 
Lester is out as genderqueer, and has been hailed as a role model for combining their identity and their public career. They have spoken about having difficulties finding work because of their gender identity and expression:

To preserve their singing voice, Lester has not used testosterone treatments, although they've since spoken about their own research showing losing a singing voice is not always a result of such therapy.

References

External links
 

1984 births
Living people
Transgender rights activists
21st-century British singers
Singers from London
British LGBT singers
British singer-songwriters
People with non-binary gender identities
Place of birth missing (living people)
English LGBT rights activists
British mezzo-sopranos
Alumni of King's College London
Alumni of Goldsmiths, University of London
British LGBT musicians
21st-century English singers
21st-century LGBT people
Non-binary musicians
Non-binary activists